A pine barrens is a type of ecosystem characterized by soil that supports pine forests but is poor for agriculture.

Some regions known as the Pine Barrens include 
Pine Barrens (New Jersey), in southern New Jersey
Atlantic coastal pine barrens
List of pine barrens
Long Island Central Pine Barrens, New York

See also
"Pine Barrens" (The Sopranos), episode of the TV series
Pine Barrens speculation, 18th century Georgia land scheme
Pinelands (disambiguation)
The Pine Barrens, a book by John McPhee